Keyl is a surname. Notable people with the surname include:

Bernhard Keil or Keyl (1624–1687), Danish Baroque painter
Ernst G. W. Keyl (1804–1872), German-American Lutheran minister
Frederick William Keyl (1823–1871), German-British painter
Julius Keyl (1877–1959), German athlete and gymnast

See also 
Keil (disambiguation)